The  is the name of a Japanese aerial lift line (known until 2012 as Piratasu Tateshina Ropeway) in Chino, Nagano, as well as its operator. The company also operates Pilatus Tateshina Snow Resort, a ski area served by the line. The company operates Tateshina Kōgen Art Museum at the submontane station as well. Opened in 1967, the line climbs , transporting skiers and rime spectators in winter, hikers in other seasons. The observatory has a view of the Yatsugatake Mountains and Southern Alps.

Basic data
System: Aerial tramway, 3 cables
Cable length: 
Vertical interval: 
Maximum gradient: 25°45′
Operational speed: 7.0 m/s
Passenger capacity per a cabin: 100
Cabins: 2
Stations: 2
Duration of one-way trip: 7 minutes

See also
List of aerial lifts in Japan

External links
 Official website

Aerial tramways in Japan
1967 establishments in Japan